Flavius Anastasius Paulus Probus Sabinianus Pompeius Anastasius (floruit 517) was a politician of the Eastern Roman Empire.

Life 
Anastasius was the son of Sabinian, consul in 505, and of a niece of emperor Anastasius I, making him the emperor's grandnephew. He may have been the brother of Flavius Anastasius Paulus Probus Moschianus Probus Magnus, consul in 518. He was married to the Empress Theodora's illegitimate daughter, whose name has not survived. They had one son, Anastasius, who married Juliana, the daughter of Probus (consul 525).

He held the consulship for the year 517. His consular diptych is preserved at the Bibliothèque Nationale de France. According to the inscription he held the honorary title of comes domesticorum equitum.

Sources
 Croke, Brian (2001), Count Marcellinus and His Chronicle, Oxford University Press, p. 89.
 Martindale, John R. (1992), "Fl. Anastasius Paulus Probus Sabinianus Pompeius Anastasius 17", The Prosopography of the Later Roman Empire II, Cambridge University Press,, pp. 82–83.

6th-century Byzantine people
6th-century Roman consuls
Imperial Roman consuls
Year of birth unknown
Year of death unknown
Pompeii (Romans)